Papin Dam is a proposed dam located in Papin village of Rawalpindi District, Punjab, Pakistan. The dam is located on a tributary of Soan River.

References

Dams in Pakistan
Hydroelectric power stations in Pakistan
Rawalpindi District
Dams in Punjab, Pakistan